Yoon Da-gyeong is a South Korean actress. She is best known to North American audiences for her performance in the film In Her Place, for which she garnered a Canadian Screen Award nomination for Best Actress at the 3rd Canadian Screen Awards in 2015, and a Wildflower Film Award nomination for Best Actress at the 3rd Wildflower Film Awards in 2016.

References

External links

South Korean film actresses
Living people
Year of birth missing (living people)